Dai Bosatsu Zendo Kongo-ji, or International Dai Bosatsu Zendo Kongo-ji, is a Rinzai monastery and retreat center located in the Catskill Mountains of upstate New York. Maintained by the Zen Studies Society, Dai Bosatsu Zendo Kongo-ji is led by Shinge-Shitsu Roko Sherry Chayat Roshi.  It is part of the Zen Studies Society, founded in 1956 to support the work of D.T. Suzuki.

Activities
The site offers daily services which include zazen, chanting and samu (work). Dai Bosatsu Zendo Kongo-ji also offers traditional kessei — a three-month period of intensive spiritual training in a Zen monastery  — in addition to weeklong sesshins and weekend retreats throughout the year. Those students who wish to ordain with Shinge Roshi must live at the monastery for 1,000 days, after which they have the option of staying or going back out into the secular world.

Location
Located about a 3-hour drive north of New York City on  near Beecher Lake in a deciduous forest region, Dai Bosatsu Zendo Kongo-ji was established on July 4, 1976. The monastery site is located atop a  drive that passes by "Sangha Meadow", a cemetery for housing the remains of deceased sangha members (including a portion of the ashes of Soen Nakagawa Roshi). The facility's upstate mailing address is in the nearby township of Livingston Manor off New York State Route 17 (NY 17), and an active New York City temple is maintained on the upper east side of Manhattan.

Controversy
In July 2010, Eido Shimano, co-founder of Dai Bosatsu Zendo Kongo-ji and an abbot for over three decades, resigned from the Zen Studies Society Board of Directors after a  relationship between Shimano and one of his female students became a subject of controversy, amid accusations that this was only the latest in a series of affairs spanning several decades. A committee of Zen teachers formed in November 2011 found that the sexual acts were often initiated during formal private sanzen interactions between Zen teacher and student. The board was aware of the situation for decades, but was unsure how to respond."

In December, 2012, Myoshinji, the headquarters of Shimano's claimed lineage sect, issued a public statement responding to the controversies surrounding Shimano and the Zen Studies Society; they state they have

See also
Eido Tai Shimano (co-founder of DBZ and an abbott for over three decades)
Sesshin
Tenzo
Chester Carlson (Daitokuin Zenshin Carlson Koji)
Zen in the United States
Timeline of Zen Buddhism in the United States
 For an explanation of terms concerning Japanese Buddhism, Japanese Buddhist art, and Japanese Buddhist temple architecture, see the Glossary of Japanese Buddhism.

Notes

References

Buddhist monasteries in the United States
Buddhist temples in New York (state)
Zen Buddhist monasteries
Zen centers in New York (state)
Rinzai school
Religious buildings and structures in Sullivan County, New York
Tourist attractions in Sullivan County, New York
1976 establishments in New York (state)